The Godecharle prize or the Godecharle contest is a contest for art students, the winners of which are granted a scholarship allocated by the Godecharle Foundation. The conditions for participation are that contestants are less than 35 years old, of Belgian nationality, or members of a country of the  European Community who have lived in Belgium for at least five years.

Napoléon Godecharle (1803-1875) created the Godecharle Foundation on the 15th of March 1871 in remembrance of his father, the prominent sculptor Gilles-Lambert Godecharle and with the aim of promoting the education and the career of young Belgian artists, either sculptors, painters or architects.

To this end, the Godecharle foundation organizes every other year a contest better-known under its French name, the Prix Godecharle (the 'Godecharleprijs' in Dutch).

The prize allows young talents, unknown before the award, to become recognized by a panel of experts made up of famous artists. The renown of the contest is based, amongst other things, upon the reputation of the artists who sit on the jury.

The foundation has entrusted a provincial board, the so-called Commission provinciale des Fondations de bourses d’études du Brabant with the management of the contest and the follow-up exhibitions of the works of participants.

The Godecharle bursaries are allocated by this board, on proposals made up by a jury of renowned artists.

The contest
The first contest was organized in 1881. At the start, the competition took place every three years on the occasion of the Salons triennaux des Beaux-Arts de Bruxelles in Belgium. Because of the First World War, the contest was adjourned until 1921. Since 1933, it is held every two years.

The laureates win prize money of 5,000 euros, granted in two instalments over two years. In accordance with its founder’s wishes, the winners have to spend this money on travelling abroad in order to improve their education or to conduct research, traditionally in Italy, the ceaseless return to Renaissance sources.

The jury

Many famous painters, sculptors and architects of these last hundred years have accepted to be members of the jury of the Godecharle contest.

Some of them are internationally recognized, including Emile Claus, Paul Delvaux, Léon Frédéric, Fernand Khnopff, Constant Permeke, Jean Brusselmans, Louis Van Lint, Victor Bourgeois,  and Pierre Alechinsky.

The successful careers of some of the winners also boosted the renown of this contest. These winners included personalities such as Victor Horta, Egide Rombaux, Victor Rousseau, John Cluysenaar, Tom Frantzen, Olivier Leloup, Guillaume Van Strydonck, Éliane de Meuse, Taf Wallet, Alfred Bastien and Isidore Opsomer.

A significant milestone in the history of the contest was the first grant of the prize to a female sculptor in 1921.  The winner Éliane de Meuse was only twenty-two years old when she won the prize. and the awarding panel comprised the Belgian symbolist Alberto Ciamberlani, Armand Rassenfosse and the Belgian neo-impressionist Emile Claus.  The winning work, entitled Daphnis et Chloé was of an impressive size, i.e.  225 cm by 180 cm, and depicted a naked young couple in an embrace. In his report to the Minister, the chairman of the panel highlighted the stylistic qualities of the composition.

The laureates
The laureates of the Prix Godecharle from 1881 to the present.

External links
 Fondation Godecharle  (in French and in Dutch)
 List of the artists and jury members of the Prix Godecharle since its creation 
 New York Public Library. Art and Architecture Division. Bibliographic guide to art and architecture. G. K. Hall., 1977.

See also
 Rome Prize
 List of European art awards

Notes

Visual arts awards
Belgian awards